The Michigan Marching Band (also known as the University of Michigan Marching Band or simply MMB) is the official marching band of the University of Michigan. The band performs at all Michigan Wolverines football home games, select away games, and numerous concerts, pep rallies, and parades. As a student musical ensemble, the MMB evolved from the original Michigan Band of twenty-two players in 1896 to today's band of over 400 members.

History

Pre-1900 
Though there is evidence of one or more bands formed at the University of Michigan between 1844 and 1859, there no continuous link between those early groups and the organization of a 22-member university band by Harry dePont on November 13, 1896. From its start, the band received no financial support from the university. The band's first performance was for the Law School's observance of Washington's Birthday on February 22, 1897. University president James Burrill Angell granted dePont's request for rehearsal space in Room A of University Hall, and by 1898 the band was being referred to as the "University of Michigan Band" and performed at football games.

1900 - 1929 
The ensemble disbanded in early 1903, but reunited that fall. Eugene J. Fischer became the band's conductor with the start of the 1906 season. During Wilfred Wilson's subsequent tenure as director, membership in the band grew to nearly 100 musicians and the university allocated permanent space for the band's use in Morris Hall. Nicholas Falcone was appointed as conductor in 1927. The band became an adjunct part of the university in 1929.

1930 - 1949 
During the Michigan-Ohio State football game in 1932, the MMB first performed a "script Ohio". That field formation was subsequently embellished by the Ohio State University Marching Band, which continues to perform a similar field routine today. The band performed at the Century of Progress exhibition in Chicago in October 1933.

On August 26, 1935, while Bernard Hirsch was serving as Acting Conductor during Nicholas Falcone's medical leave due to hearing loss, the university offered Falcone's position to William D. Revelli who accepted. By 1942, the band had been "voted 'All-American Band' by the nation's sportswriters" for two consecutive years. The band was able to continue performing during the years of World War II. The band's home was relocated to Harris Hall in 1946.

1950 - 1969 
Life Magazine featured the band's New York City performance in its October 30, 1950, edition that included an Alfred Eisenstadt photograph of children marching behind drum major Dick Smith. During Homecoming Weekend in November 1950, sixty-five former Michigan bandsmen attended a reunion which resulted in the formation of the University of Michigan Band Alumni Association.  In 1953, the Alumni Band began to join the regular band playing and marching at the Homecoming pre-game and halftime shows. George R. Cavender was appointed as Assistant Director of Bands for the University of Michigan in 1952. The band was featured on a color broadcast of the "Today Show" with host Dave Garroway in October 1955. The MMB performed in the so-called "Snow Bowl" game against Ohio State in late November, and later traveled by train to perform in the 1951 Rose Bowl.

Starting in 1961, the Symphony Band recorded several music albums released by Vanguard Records that were credited to "University of Michigan Band." These albums documented the continued, functional specialization of the various ensembles comprising the Michigan Bands at that time. The Varsity Band played at basketball games and campus affairs. The Symphony Band performed in more traditional concert settings. The Marching Band performed at football games. The band received new uniforms, percussion equipment, and fiberglass sousaphones in 1962. The annual Band-O-Rama concert was first held in November 1964. The band performed its "Peace Show" at the nationally televised Michigan-Ohio State football game in 1969. The MMB also performed at the 1970 Rose Bowl following the 1969 season.

1970 - 1989 
In 1970, Carl Grapentine became the "Voice of the Michigan Bands" and is now also the "Voice of Michigan Stadium." The performance block had grown to 210 members. Dr. Revelli retired from the band in the summer of 1971, succeeded by Cavender. Women were allowed to join the marching band starting in 1972. The MMB performed as part of the halftime show at 1973's Super Bowl VII, collaborating with Woody Herman and Andy Williams. A new facility, named Revelli Hall, was built to house the marching band. The MMB's practice field formally known as Wines Field was renamed Elbel Field. Cavender retired in 1979 and was succeeded by Glenn Richter. The MMB performed at the 1972, 1977, and 1978 Rose Bowl games, as well as at the 1976 Orange Bowl game. The 1978 Rose Bowl performance featured the first public performance of the John Williams' musical score to the movie, Close Encounters of the Third Kind.

Eric Becher succeeded Richter as the MMB's conductor in 1980. The band appeared on the television special, A Bob Hope Celebration on October 22, 1981. In 1982, the MMB performed in Super Bowl XVI and was selected as the inaugural winner of the Sudler Trophy. The MMB also performed at the final game of the 1984 World Series in Tiger Stadium and survived a mob attack in the riot that followed. In 1989, Jerry Luckhardt became the MMB's conductor. The MMB performed at the 1981, 1983, 1987, and 1989 Rose Bowl games.

1990 - 2019 
Dr. Gary Lewis became Director of the MMB in 1990. On November 20, 1992, the MMB appeared as musical guests on the ABC television variety show, Live with Regis and Kathie Lee. Jeff Grogan directed the band for the 1995 season. Dr. Kevin Sedatole was appointed as Director of the MMB in 1996, with Grogan remaining as Assistant Director. Dr. James Tapia was appointed as Director of the MMB in 1999. The band performed at the 1990 Rose Bowl.

In 2001, Jamie L. Nix was hired as the 13th Director of the MMB. That same year, the MMB elected Karen England as its first female Drum Major. On January 2, 2007, having performed at the Rose Bowl the previous day, the Michigan Marching Band attended the arrival of President Gerald Ford's body in Grand Rapids, Michigan. The MMB honored President Ford's funeral procession with somber performances of "Ruffles and Flourishes," "Hail to the Chief," "The Yellow and Blue," and "The Victors." Dr. Scott Boerma succeeded Nix as director of the band that same year.

In 2013, Dr. John Pasquale became Director of the MMB. He replaced Dr. Scott Boerma, who announced his resignation as director following the 2013 Outback Bowl to take the position of Director of Bands at his alma mater, Western Michigan University. Dr. Andrea Brown was hired as the band's Associate Director, becoming the first female Associate Director at the University of Michigan. In 2015, the band collaborated with conductor Alan Gilbert and the brass section of the New York Philharmonic for a halftime performance consisting of 1,000 performers.

2020 - Present 
The Michigan Marching Band announced an entirely virtual season for the 2020-2021 academic year in response to the Coronavirus (COVID-19) pandemic.

On September 11, 2021, for the 20th anniversary of the September 11 terrorist attacks on the United States, the Michigan Marching Band performed a tribute showed entitled "We Remember," in conjunction with Durant Design. The show featured selections from John Williams' Summon the Heroes; West Side Story's Mambo; Billy Joel's New York State of Mind; Jay-Z and Alicia Keys' Empire State of Mind; Hamilton's Who Lives, Who Dies, Who Tells Your Story; Woody Guthrie's This Land is Your Land; and John Philip Sousa's Stars & Stripes Forever.

Past directors and drum majors

Halftime Shows

Discography

Albums 
 Forever Valiant (2017)
This is Michigan (2012)
 2008 Season Highlights (2009)
 Gameday Faves: Michigan Wolverines Classics (2009)
The Maize Album (2009)
The Blue Album (2008)
 2005 Season Highlights (2005)
 The Victors Valiant (2003)
 2002 Season Highlights (2002)
 It's All About Blue (2000)</ref>
 Hurrah for the Yellow and Blue (1998)
 A Saturday Tradition (1993)
 Fire Up... It's Saturday (1985)
 1983 Rose Bowl Highlights (1983)
 Halftime Classics (1978)
 "Revelli's Michigan Stadium Echoes" 1935 — 1971 (Unknown date after 1970)
 MICHIGAN (1972)
 The Yellow And Blue / The Victors-March (1926)

Other album appearances 
 Various Artists: Gameday Faves: Classic College Fight Songs (Volume 2): "The Victors - Michigan Wolverines (Live)" (2008)
 Destiny's Child: Destiny Fulfilled: "Lose My Breath," drum cadence sample (2004)

Filmography

Documentaries 
 Take The Field (2019)
The Band Director (1973)
 Marching For Roses (1971)
 Pow Pow (1960)
 Here Comes the Band (1951)

Soundtrack contributions 
 Love, Simon: "Bad Romance," "What Is Love" (2018)
 Deliver Us from Eva: "The Victors" (2003)
 Bicentennial Man: "The Washington Post" (1999)
 The Waterboy: "Entry Cadence," "Temptation," "Hawaiian War Chant" (1998)
 The Sixth Man: "Let's Go Blue" (1997)

References

External links

 

Big Ten Conference marching bands
University of Michigan
Musical groups from Michigan
Music of Ann Arbor, Michigan
Musical groups established in 1896
1896 establishments in Michigan